Martín Alonso (born 2 December 1999) is a Spanish rugby union winger and he currently plays for La Rochelle in the French Top 14.

Considered one of Spanish rugby's biggest hopes, he is an international with both 7's and XV sides.

References

External links
ESPN Profile

1999 births
Living people
Sportspeople from Valladolid
Spanish rugby union players
Rugby union wings
Stade Rochelais players